Milo is an unincorporated community in Bureau County, Illinois, United States, located east-northeast of Bradford.

References

Unincorporated communities in Bureau County, Illinois
Unincorporated communities in Illinois